Vladimir Leonidovich Gulyaev (30 October 1924, Yekaterinburg, RSFSR — 3 October 1997, Moscow) was a Soviet actor of theater and cinema.

Biography 
He was born October 30, 1924 in Sverdlovsk (now Yekaterinburg, Russia). His father was as candidate of historical sciences and the deputy head of the political department of the Molotov Military Aviation. During World War II, he went to work as a mechanic in an aviation workshop, and in 1942, became a cadet of Molotovskaya military aviation school of pilots. Having graduated with honors and received in November 1943 and received the rank of Junior Lieutenant of the Air Force. He fought in Belarus and the Baltic States. He ended his service as a Red Army lieutenant in East Prussia. He participated in the  Moscow Victory Parade of 1945 on Red Square. He graduated from Gerasimov Institute of Cinematography in 1951. As a student, he married his classmate Rimma Shorokhov. By the mid-1950s, the couple broke up. Form 1951-1988, he was an actor at the National Film Actors' Theatre. 
He died on November 3, 1997 at the age of 73 in Moscow. He was buried at a columbarium in Kuntsevo Cemetery.

Selected filmography

 The Village Doctor (1952) as Viktor Potapov
 Incident in the Taiga (1954) as Yasha
 Least We Forget (1954) as student
 Did We Meet Somewhere Before (1954) as cyclist
 World Champion (1955) as Konstantin Kovalyov
 Other People's Relatives (1956) as Gulyaev
 Spring on Zarechnaya Street (1956) as Yura
 Jurášek (1957) as Solovjev
 Alyosha's Love (1961) as Sergey
 Chronicle of Flaming Years (1961) as Military tribunal member
 The Chairman (1964) as Vladimir Ramenkov
 Come Here, Mukhtar! (1965) as senior instructor
 Operation Y and Shurik's Other Adventures (1965) as policeman  (uncredited)
 Zigzag of Success (1968) as policeman
 The Diamond Arm (1968) as Lieutenant  
 The Secret Agent's Blunder (1968) as taxi driver in Leningrad
 Dangerous Tour (1969) as policeman
 Grandads-Robbers (1972) as driver
 Earthly Love (1975) as Smirnov
 It Can't Be! (1975) as One-eyed furniture dealer
 Jaroslaw Dabrowski (1976) as episode

References

External links
 
 

1924 births
1997 deaths
Soviet male film actors
Burials at Kuntsevo Cemetery
Recipients of the Order of the Red Banner
Honored Artists of the RSFSR
Gerasimov Institute of Cinematography alumni
Soviet World War II pilots
Communist Party of the Soviet Union members
Actors from Yekaterinburg